George Murray Paterson (6 November 1940 – 26 July 2020) was a New Zealand rower.

At the 1962 British Empire and Commonwealth Games he won the gold medal as part of the coxed four event alongside fellow Waitaki Boys' High School crew members Keith Heselwood, Hugh Smedley and Winston Stephens, plus Waikato cox Doug Pulman. Their coach was Rusty Robertson.

Paterson competed at the 1964 Olympics in the men's eight event. His brother-in-law Gary Robertson is also a retired Olympic rower.

Paterson died in Christchurch on 26 July 2020.

References

External links
 
 

1940 births
2020 deaths
New Zealand male rowers
Olympic rowers of New Zealand
Rowers at the 1964 Summer Olympics
Rowers at the 1962 British Empire and Commonwealth Games
Commonwealth Games gold medallists for New Zealand
Commonwealth Games medallists in rowing
People educated at Waitaki Boys' High School
People from Milton, New Zealand
Medallists at the 1962 British Empire and Commonwealth Games